Sekolah Menengah Kebangsaan Taman Melawati (SMKTM) (Taman Melawati National Secondary School) is a co-educational secondary school located in Taman Melawati, Gombak, Selangor, 20 km from the centre of Kuala Lumpur . The school has outperformed other high schools within the Gombak district in annual rankings of academic performance. Top scorers in the SPM (Malaysian Certificate of Education) national examinations make up the school's alumni, and will typically be awarded a full scholarship from the government to pursue their tertiary studies.

The school has participated in events such as marching competitions, choir competitions, drama competitions and debate tournaments. 

SMKTM has a student body of approximately 1800 pupils, aged between 13-17 years. Due to space constraints, classes are divided into two sessions, with the first session of classes running in the mornings (Forms 3, 4, and 5 ) and the second in the afternoons (Form 1 and 2). There are 12 classrooms in every form, with an average of 35 students in each class.

History
1991
The school was established with 2 blocks of buildings, Block C and Block D, and a canteen with the number of students at 403.

1994
The third block, Block B, was opened to accommodate the number of students.

1998
A Surau was built for students to perform their prayers. 

2001
The school hall was built with the cost of RM1.8 million.

2003
Two new blocks were built, Block A and Block E

2010
The sixth block, Frangipani, was opened, housing a second art studio and one Sixth Form classroom.

School Administration

Co-Curriculum
Students join three co-curricular activities (clubs, sports/games, uniformed society) which meet every week starting from early in the year until the end of first term in June. Additional meetings may be held in the second term with agreement from the supervising teacher.

Clubs
Academic
Malay Language Club
English Club
Mathematics Club
History club
Science club
Islam Club
Innovation club
Arabic Language club
Art Club
Tamil Language club
French Language Club 

Non-academic
Culture club
School cooperation club
Photography
Taekwando club
Choir Club
Charity Club
Form 6 club
SLAD
Crime Prevention Club
Environmental Club
Drama Club

Sports/Games
Sepak Takraw
Football
Netball
Ping Pong
Softball
Athletics club
Chess
Volleyball
Badminton
Football
Golf
Handball
Bowling

Uniformed societies
Scouts 
Girl Guides
Police Cadets
Youth cadets (KRS)
Seni Silat Gayong
Fire Brigade Cadets (Kadet Bomba)
Persatuan Kadet Bersatu Malaysia (PKBM)
Puteri Islamic

Facilities
The school consists of six main blocks and other facilities as follows :
School Hall
Library with a computer room
School Mosque                                                                                              
Two parking lots for cars, motorbikes, and bicycles
Basketball, volleyball, and badminton courts
A field
Six General Science laboratories
Two Chemistry laboratories
Two Physics laboratories
Two Biology laboratories
Two Art studios

School magazine
The school magazine, Persada, has been published annually since 1995.

See also
List of schools in Malaysia

Schools in Selangor